Ratměřice is a municipality and village in Benešov District in the Central Bohemian Region of the Czech Republic. It has about 300 inhabitants.

Administrative parts
Villages of Hrzín and Skrýšov are administrative parts of Ratměřice.

References

Villages in Benešov District